Bernard Paweł Ormanowski (10 November 1907 – 7 December 1984) was a Polish rower who competed in the 1928 Summer Olympics.

He was born in Lippink, Schwert. In 1928 he won the bronze medal as member of the Polish boat in the coxed four event. He died in Bydgoszcz.

References

External links
 profile 

1907 births
1984 deaths
Polish male rowers
Olympic rowers of Poland
Rowers at the 1928 Summer Olympics
Olympic bronze medalists for Poland
Olympic medalists in rowing
People from Świecie County
Sportspeople from Kuyavian-Pomeranian Voivodeship
Medalists at the 1928 Summer Olympics